Al-Seeb, As Seeb or As Sib is a coastal fishing city, located several kilometres northwest of Muscat, in northeastern Oman. As of the 2020 census, it had a population of 470,878.

Landmarks include the Naseem Garden, the Royal Stables and Equestrian Centre, Royal Guard of Oman Technical College, the Bait al Baraka palace, Muscat International Airport (formerly known as Seeb International Airport) and Markaz al Bahja.

History
The “Fort of Sibo” was located in Seeb (As Seeb or As Sib), a few kilometers northwest of Muscat, capital of the Sultanate of Oman.

It complemented the defense of Muscat Square, which was one of its first and most important defenses. It was part of a serial of fortified cities that the Portugal had to control the access to the Persian Gulf and the Gulf of Oman, like Khor Fakan, Muscat, Sohar, Seeb, Qurayyat and Muttrah. It is demolished, at its former place today stands the Muscat International Airport.

The Seeb is famous for being the location in which the Treaty of Seeb agreement took place between the Imamate of Oman and the Sultanate of Muscat on 25 September 1920. This treaty divided Oman into two distinct regions, the interior and the coast, which were separated historically by the Al Hajar Mountains.

Regions in Al-Seeb
The state has many different regions that are diverse in culture and nature, these include Al Khoudh, where Sultan Qaboos University is located, AlMabellah, AlHail, Ar Rusail, Muscat Hills, and Wadi Lawami. Muscat International Airport is also located in the state which takes a good portion of the land.

Intelligence gathering
In June 2014 The Register disclosed that Seeb is the location of a "beyond top secret" GCHQ internet monitoring site.

Sports
Al-Seeb Club and Al-Shabab are located in Seeb.

Wadi Al-Khoudh
Wadi Al-Khoudh is a Valley in Al-Seeb which is a major tourist attraction for locals and foreigners, and it is located near Old Al-Khoudh Village in the state, The valley is most popular for off-road adventurers. The valley has a beautiful mixture of mesmerizing sights varying from clear water pools, green outcrops, and rock formations. It is definitely a worthy place for a picnic.

Seeb has a hot desert climate (Köppen climate classification BWh) with very hot summers and warm winters. Precipitation is low, and falls mainly in the months from December to April.

References

 
Populated places in the Muscat Governorate
Populated coastal places in Oman